Toukoto is a small town and commune near the confluence of the Bakoy and Baloué rivers in the Cercle of Kita in the Kayes Region of south-western Mali. As well as the town of Toukoto, the commune includes 5 other villages. In the 2009 census the commune had a population of 10,020.

References

External links
.

Communes of Kayes Region